Maggie May Baird (born ) is an American actress, screenwriter, and former theater troupe teacher. Baird grew up in Colorado performing music, and studied theater and dance at the University of Utah, before moving to New York City, where she performed on Broadway. She made her television debut in 1981 in the soap opera Another World and her film debut in the 1989 feature An Innocent Man.

Baird continued to act in television and film after moving to Los Angeles in 1991, and became a member and teacher at The Groundlings, a troupe and Improvisational theatre school. She acted in 2000s television series such as Bones, The X-Files and Six Feet Under, and provided the voices of Samara in the video game series Mass Effect, and various characters in the Saints Row game series. In 2009, Baird released her debut studio album, We Sail.

Baird married Patrick O'Connell in 1995, with whom she has two children: musicians Finneas O'Connell and Billie Eilish. She wrote and co-starred with her son Finneas in the 2013 film Life Inside Out, which garnered Baird critical acclaim for her performance. In 2016, she edited the music video for "Six Feet Under" for her daughter Billie.

Early life
Baird was born and raised in Fruita, Colorado, where she learned the piano and guitar as a teenager. She graduated from Fruita Monument High School in 1977. She studied theater and dance at University of Utah before later moving to New York City, where she performed in the 1985 revival of The Iceman Cometh on Broadway, and several Off-Broadway shows. In 1991, Baird moved to Los Angeles, California, where she acted in television and film productions such as L.A. Law, Murphy Brown, Walker, Texas Ranger and Picket Fences.

Career 
She made her debut television appearance in 1981, playing a supporting role in the American soap opera Another World, before spending nine months touring with The Heidi Chronicles in 1990, where she played the role of one of Heidi's friends. She played Taylor Baldwin on the soap opera As the World Turns in 1987 before making her film debut as Stacy in An Innocent Man in 1989.

From 1994 to 2000, Baird was a member and teacher at the Groundlings, an improvisational and sketch comedy troupe and school in Los Angeles. While at the Groundlings, Baird taught and performed with actors such as Will Ferrell, Kristen Wiig and Melissa McCarthy, becoming McCarthy's first improv teacher. Baird has been a voice actress in video games such as the Mass Effect series, the Saints Row series, the EverQuest II series, Lightning Returns: Final Fantasy XIII, Rogue Galaxy and Vampire: The Masquerade – Redemption.

Some of her notable acting roles from the 2000s to 2010s are Sharon Pearl in The X-Files in 2000, Sandra Hicks in Bones in 2009, Andrea Kuhn in Six Feet Under in 2005, and the asari Samara from the original Mass Effect trilogy. In March 2009, Baird released her debut studio album We Sail, an eleven-track country record.

Baird wrote, co-produced, acted and provided the soundtrack for the film Life Inside Out which was released in October 2013. The film, which explores the relationship between a mother and son through music, features Baird's real-life son Finneas. Gary Goldstein from Los Angeles Times wrote "A beautiful demonstration of a mother's love concludes this special little film on a hugely touching note."

In 2016, Baird edited the music video for the US gold-certified song "Six Feet Under" by her daughter, Billie Eilish. Baird portrayed Zach Galifianakis's sister in a deleted scene from the 2019 film Between Two Ferns: The Movie.

Personal life 

In 1995, she married American actor Patrick O'Connell, who she had met while performing in Alaska, and had her son Finneas two years later. Baird had a daughter, Billie Eilish, in Highland Park, Los Angeles, in December 2001, where they currently live as of January 2021. She and her husband decided to homeschool their children, with Baird stating: "Homeschooling allows us to let them do the things that they really love to do and not have a giant academic schedule on top of it.

Filmography

Television

Film

Video games

Discography

Awards and nominations

References

External links

Living people
Billie Eilish
20th-century American actresses
21st-century American actresses
Actresses from Los Angeles
Singer-songwriters from California
Actresses from Colorado
American voice actresses
American video game actresses
American television actresses
American stage actresses
American acoustic guitarists
American country singer-songwriters
American women country singers
Drama teachers
People from Mesa County, Colorado
University of Utah alumni
Country musicians from Colorado
Singer-songwriters from Colorado
1950s births